Maurizio Pollini (born 5 January 1942) is an Italian pianist. He is known for performances of compositions by Beethoven, Chopin and Debussy, among others. He has also championed and performed works by contemporary composers such as Pierre Boulez, Karlheinz Stockhausen, George Benjamin, Roberto Carnevale, Gianluca Cascioli and Bruno Maderna. Works composed for him include Luigi Nono's ... sofferte onde serene ..., Giacomo Manzoni's Masse: omaggio a Edgard Varèse and Salvatore Sciarrino's Fifth Sonata.

Life and career 
Pollini was born in Milan to the Italian rationalist architect Gino Pollini, who has been said to be the first to bring Modernist architecture to Italy in the 1930s, and his wife Renata Melotti (sister of the Italian sculptor Fausto Melotti). Pollini studied piano first with Carlo Lonati, until the age of 13, then with Carlo Vidusso, until he was 18. He received a diploma from the Milan Conservatory and won both the International Ettore Pozzoli Piano Competition in Seregno (Italy) in 1959 and the VI International Chopin Piano Competition in Warsaw in 1960. Arthur Rubinstein, who led the jury, declared Pollini the winner of the competition, allegedly saying: "that boy can play the piano better than any of us". Following his success at the competition, Pollini didn't perform for a year in order to expand his musical experience, leading to erroneous rumors that he had become a recluse.  Soon afterwards, he recorded Chopin's Concerto No. 1 in E minor with the Philharmonia Orchestra under the Polish conductor Paul Kletzki for EMI, and taped performances of Chopin's etudes. When the Philharmonia offered Pollini a series of concerts, he experienced what EMI producer Peter Andry has called "an apparent crisis of confidence". After this, he studied with Arturo Benedetti Michelangeli, from whom he is said to have acquired "a precise technique and emotional restraint", although some have expressed a concern that Michelangeli's influence resulted in Pollini's playing becoming "mannered and cold". During the early 1960s, Pollini limited his concertizing, preferring to spend these years studying by himself and expanding his repertoire.

Since the mid-1960s, he has given recitals and appeared with orchestras in Europe, the United States, and the Far East. He made his American debut in 1968 and his first tour of Japan in 1974.

In 1985, on the occasion of Johann Sebastian Bach's tricentenary, he performed the complete first book of The Well-Tempered Clavier. In 1987 he played the complete piano concertos of Ludwig van Beethoven in New York with the Vienna Philharmonic under Claudio Abbado and received on this occasion the orchestra's Honorary Ring. In 1993-94 he played his first complete Beethoven Piano Sonatas cycle in Berlin and Munich and later also in New York City, Milan, Paris, London and Vienna. At the Salzburg Festival in 1995 he inaugurated the "Progetto Pollini", a series of concerts in which old and new works are juxtaposed. An analogous series took place at Carnegie Hall in 2000–01 with "Perspectives: Maurizio Pollini" and at London's Royal Festival Hall in 2010–11 with the "Pollini Project", a series of five concerts with programmes ranging from Bach to Stockhausen. Throughout his career, Pollini has advocated the performance of little known or forgotten works.

In March 2012 it was announced that Pollini had cancelled all his forthcoming appearances in the US for health reasons.

In 2014, Pollini played on a tour including the Salzburg Festival and his debut at the Rheingau Musik Festival, playing in the Kurhaus Wiesbaden Chopin's  Preludes (Op. 28) and Book 1 of Debussy's Preludes.

Pollini is father of the pianist and conductor Daniele Pollini.

Recordings 
Pollini's first recordings for Deutsche Grammophon in 1971 included Stravinsky's Trois mouvements de Petrouchka and Prokofiev's Seventh Sonata and are still considered a landmark of twentieth century piano discography. He recorded Chopin's Etudes, Opp. 10 and 25, also under Deutsche Grammophon. In 2002, Deutsche Grammophon released a 13-CD commemorative edition to celebrate the pianist's 60th birthday, and a complete edition on 58 discs of his recordings for the label, on the occasion of his 75th. His Beethoven Piano Sonatas cycle was completed in 2014 and was released in an 8-CD box set.

While known for possessing an exceptional technique, Pollini has been criticised for emotional conservatism.  However, in his interviews, Maurizio Pollini has stated that throughout his career his concern has been to express the composer as accurately as possible.  He is not concerned with his own emotion.

Political views 
During the 1960s and 1970s, Pollini was a left-wing political activist. He collaborated with Luigi Nono in such works as Como una ola de fuerza y luz (1972), which was to mourn the accidental death of Luciano Cruz, a leader of the Chilean Revolutionary Front. He performed with Claudio Abbado at La Scala in a cycle of concerts for students and workers, in an attempt to build a new public as they believed that art should be for everybody. At least one of Pollini's recitals was beset by audience unrest and concluded upon police intervention when he mentioned Vietnam. Pollini has said that he now questions the way left-wing activists operated in Italy, although he still identifies with the left.

Awards and recognition 
In 1996, Pollini received the Ernst von Siemens Music Prize. In 2001, his recording of Beethoven's Diabelli Variations won the Diapason d'or. In 2007, Pollini received the Grammy Award for Best Instrumental Soloist Performance (without orchestra) for his Deutsche Grammophon recording of Chopin nocturnes. He was awarded the Praemium Imperiale in 2010. He entered the Gramophone Hall of Fame in 2012.

References

Further reading

External links
 Maurizio Pollini interview, (October 23, 1997)

Italian classical pianists
Male classical pianists
Italian male pianists
Italian male conductors (music)
International Chopin Piano Competition winners
1942 births
Living people
Deutsche Grammophon artists
Ernst von Siemens Music Prize winners
Grammy Award winners
Recipients of the Praemium Imperiale
Milan Conservatory alumni
International Ettore Pozzoli Piano Competition prize-winners
Musicians from Milan
20th-century Italian conductors (music)
20th-century Italian male musicians
21st-century Italian conductors (music)
21st-century Italian male musicians
20th-century classical pianists